The Luhansk Oblast Council is the regional oblast council (parliament) of the Luhansk Oblast (province) located in eastern Ukraine.

In Ukraine Oblast Council members are elected for five year terms. In order to gain representation in the council, a party must gain more than 5 percent of the total vote.

Following the 2014 start of the War in Donbass elections for the Luhansk Oblast Council have not been held and their functions are currently being performed by a civil–military administration.

References

Council
Regional legislatures of Ukraine
Unicameral legislatures